Hércules was a professional football team that played in San Salvador, El Salvador.

They were founded on 25 September 1904 as Club Deportivo Hercules as asporting club focused on athletics, swimming, basketball and football.

Hércules was a powerhouse during the late 1920s and early 1930s, winning titles in 1927, 1928 and in the 1929–30, 1930–31, 1931–32, 1932–33, 1933–34 seasons. Although the Primera División de Fútbol Profesional in El Salvador didn't exist at that time, and the Salvadoran Sports Commission (Comisión Nacional de Educación Física) didn't conduct an official national tournament during those years, the championships they won are often considered the national titles.

Hercules won their first title on the 13th of November, 1927 defeating Chinameca S.C. 3-0.

Honours
El Salvador National Football Championship: 7
 1927, 1928, 1929–30, 1930–31, 1931–32, 1932–33, 1933–34

Record
 From 1927 to 1933, the club won seven successive league titles, equalling the all-time record.

Historical Matches

Notable players
 Américo González
 Tono Melendez Cangrejo
 Rogelio Jocote Aviles
 Miguel Tabata Aguilar
 Santiago Barrachina

References

Defunct football clubs in El Salvador